The 2014 season was Western New York Flash's seventh season of existence, and the second in which they competed in the National Women's Soccer League, the top division of women's soccer in the United States.

Club

Current roster

Team management

Match results

Pre-season

Regular season

Standings

Results summary

Results by round

Squad statistics
Note: only regular season squad statistics displayed

Key to positions: FW - Forward, MF - Midfielder, DF - Defender, GK - Goalkeeper

See also
 2014 National Women's Soccer League season

References

Western New York Flash seasons
Western New York Flash
Western New York Flash
Western New York Flash